Black Fox may refer to:

 Black Fox (Cherokee chief), a chief of the Cherokee from 1801 to 1811
 Black Fox (miniseries), a 1995 miniseries, with Tony Todd and Christopher Reeve
 Blackfox (2019 film), a Japanese anime film
 Black Fox: The Rise and Fall of Adolf Hitler, a 1962 documentary film
 Black Fox (Raul Chalmers), a supervillain character in Marvel Comics
 Black Fox (Robert Paine), a superhero character in Marvel Comics
 Black Fox Nuclear Power Plant, a nuclear power plant proposed by the Public Service Company of Oklahoma in 1973
 The Black Fox, a character in The Court Jester, played by Edward Ashley

See also
 Fisher (animal)
 Fox
 Silver fox (animal)